A bride is a female participant in a wedding ceremony.

Bride(s) or The Bride may also refer to:

Geography
 Bride (parish), a parish on the Isle of Man
 Bride (river) a river in the south of Ireland

People
 Brìde or Brigid, a goddess in Irish mythology
 Bride of Ireland or Brigit of Kildare, Christian saint
 Harold Bride (1890–1956), junior wireless operator on the RMS Titanic
 Jonah Bride (born 1995), American baseball player
 Tina Bride (born 1977), Flemish singer

Plants and animals
 Exochorda ('The Bride'), a flowering shrub cultivar
 Bride moth (Catocala neogama)

Books and magazines
 Brides (magazine), an American monthly magazine
 The Bride, a 1989 novel by Julie Garwood  
 The Bride, a 1982 novel by Bapsi Sidhwa
 The Bride, a Marvel Comics series by Reginald Hudlin 
 The Bride: the story of Louise and Montrose, a 1939 novel by Margaret Irwin

Film and TV 
 The Bride (1973 Turkish film), a Turkish drama film
 The Bride (1973 American film), a horror film starring Robin Strasser
 The Bride (1985 film), an adaptation of Mary Shelley's Frankenstein, starring Sting and Jennifer Beals
 Brides (2004 film) or Nyfes, a Greek film
 Brides (2014 film), a Georgian-French film directed by Tinatin Kajrishvili
 The Bride (2015 Spanish film), a Spanish film directed by Paula Ortiz
 The Bride (2015 Taiwanese film), a Taiwanese horror film directed by Lingo Hsieh
 The Bride (2017 film), a Russian film
 Bride (film), a 2018 Burmese horror film

Fictional characters
 The Bride (Kill Bill), the protagonist of Quentin Tarantino's Kill Bill films

Music
 Bride (band), a Christian rock band

Albums
 Brides (album), a 1987 album by Annabel Lamb
 The Bride (album), a 2016 album by Bat for Lashes

Songs
 "The Bride", a 1971 song by The Bintangs
 "The Bride" (song), a 2004 song by Trick Pony
 "The Bride", a song by Dirty Projectors from their 2009 album Bitte Orca